The Orphey Hydro Power Plant is an active hydro power project near Krichim, Bulgaria. It has 4 individual Francis turbines which will deliver up to 160 MW of power. One of the turbines can be used as a pump as well (38 MW), making this power plant a pumped storage type. The plant uses water from the Vacha Reservoir, and is part of the Dospat-Vacha Hydro Power Cascade. The plant is named after Orpheus, who is said to have lived in these lands.

References

Hydroelectric power stations in Bulgaria
Buildings and structures in Plovdiv Province
Pumped-storage hydroelectric power stations in Bulgaria